Made with Code is an initiative launched by Google on 19 July 2014. Google aimed to empower young women in middle and high schools with computer programming skills. Made with Code was created after Google's own research found out that encouragement and exposure are the critical factors that would influence young females to pursue computer science. It was reported that Google is funding $50 million to Made with Code, on top of the initial $40 million invested since 2010 in organizations like Code.org, Black Girls Code, and Girls Who Code. The Made with Code initiative involves both online activities as well as real life events, collaborating with notable firms like Shapeways and App Inventor.

Projects 
Made with Code revolves primarily around providing online activities for young girls to learn coding on its website. Many of Made with Code's projects use Blockly programming, a visual editor that writes programs by assembling individual blocks. Step by step instructions are provided to guide users. Along the way, works may either be discarded or saved and downloaded.

Dance Visualiser 
Dance Visualiser mixes dance with code by modelling a visualiser that mirrors a dancer's motions. Through the application of Blockly programming, users track the different parts such as the head, chest, hip and four limbs of the dancer's body. After inputting the necessary details, a customized visualization is generated accordingly.

Music Mixer 
In Music Mixer, users manipulate the number of notes and set the speed of each instrument to produce a colorful rotating visual music mixer. The range of instruments that are available include Acapella, Country, Electronic, HipHop, Pop and Rock.

Beats 
Beats connects Blockly programming language and virtual instruments together to produce a string of beats. Users set the speed from a minimum of 30 to a maximum of 300 beats. The range of virtual instruments available include hi-hat, clave, cowbell, cymbal, tom, kick, snare and clap.

Avatar 
Project Avatar allows users to customize their own avatar. Through Blockly programming language, users input different shapes on a virtual 2D work space, then arrange the shapes into a 3D avatar.

Accessorizer 
Accessorizer allow to accessorize (put accessories on) a selfie with Blockly programming language. The first step is selecting an image, either by snapping a picture or selecting the available characters including Dorothy, Rose, Smoosh, Raul and Blanche. The next step is to position the accessories on top of the character or image. Accessories include the eyes, mouths, shirts, hats and wigs.

GIF 
GIF lets users make a custom animation with a background and a series of frame. With the Blockly programming language, four images can be constructed which will then cycle so as to form an animation. The first step is to select the background, which includes characters such as Licky Ricky, Mayday Mary, Puss in Moon Boots, Purple Mess, Flappy the Uni-Horn, Tonsil Tammy, Bucky, Long Lidia, Permy and Mr. Hula Hips. The next step is to select frame(s), which includes various shapes and colors.

Kaleidoscope 
Kaleidoscope lets users manipulate the size, speed, and images of a kaleidoscope animation. After selecting an animation, either star, cross or flower, users pick an image and select a rotation speed. Next, select the image size by entering a percentage value.

Yeti 
Yeti project allows users to create an animated Yeti with Blockly programming language. The first step is to drag and insert the YETI block onto the work space, followed by the character design block. Select the fur and skin color of your Yeti, as well as the hand and feet sizes. Next, select the animation command from the various range of actions provided.

Past notable projects

Code a Bracelet 
Made with Code collaborated with Shapeways to allow girls to create their own customised bracelet. After designing the bracelet with Blockly, Shapeways prints the bracelets using nylon plastic on their 3D EOS printers.

Mentors and makers 
Made with Code website features videos of mentors, who are females in different industries who have used computer coding in their career, and makers, who are young females who have made a difference in society using their coding skills. Some of the mentors and makers were also invited to hold talks such as during Made with Code's kick off event in New York City. Over 100 teenage girls from local organizations and public schools worked on coding projects and witnessed first-hand how women use code in their dream jobs.

List of mentors 
 Ayah Bdeir
 Danielle Feinberg
 Erica Kochi
 Limor Fried
 Miral Kotb
 Robin Hunicke

List of makers 
 Brittany Wenger
 Kenzie Wilson
 Maddy Maxey
 EPA Chica Squad
 Tesca Fitzgerald
 Ebony "WondaGurl" Oshunrinde

Events 
Made with Code website has a resource directory for parents and girls to enter their ZIP code and find more information about new local events.

92nd annual White House Christmas Tree Lighting Ceremony 
Made with Code partnered with National Park Foundation to organised a campaign in 2014 to light up 56 official White House Christmas trees in President's Park. More than 300,000 people, mostly young girls, participated and programmed the designs of the lights on the trees through selecting different shapes, sizes, and colors of the lights, and animate different patterns using introductory programming language.

Others

Partnership with Code School 
Made with Code has partnered with Code School in June 2014 and provided three-month free accounts in Code School for women and minorities already in the technology industry to expand their skills. This initiative widened Made with Code's target group to also include those who have already started a career in the tech industry, in addition to the initial target group of young without prior coding experience.

Google raise gender diversity in Code School by giving $50 million over three years to provide for related programs. They concurrently work with DonorsChoose.org and Codecademy or Khan Academy for the trial of a project. They also collaborated with the Science and Entertainment Exchange.

References

External links 

2014 establishments in California
Computer science education
Google